Ilga Bērtulsone (born 10 January 1966) is a Latvian athlete. She competed in the women's discus throw at the 1992 Summer Olympics.

References

External links
 

1966 births
Living people
Athletes (track and field) at the 1992 Summer Olympics
Latvian female discus throwers
Olympic athletes of Latvia
Place of birth missing (living people)